"Faith" is a song recorded by Canadian recording artist Celine Dion, for her eight English-language studio album, One Heart (2003). It was released on 27 October 2003 as the third promotional only single in Canada from the album and was the fifth single overall. "Faith" was written and produced by Max Martin and Rami Yacoub. The remixed version by the Original 3 (who also did the "One Heart" remixes) was released as a radio single. "Faith" reached number 4 on the Quebec Airplay Chart and number 37 on the Canadian Adult Contemporary Chart.

Background and writing 

"Faith" was composed by Max Martin and Rami Yacoub, while production was handled by Martin and Rami. Martin also wrote for Dion her smash hit "That's the Way It Is" in 1999. Beyond the production, the song was recorded and mixed by Martin and Rami. It was recorded at Echo Beach Studios, in Florida. In "Faith", Dion is thrilled that, in spite of her faults, her man loves her anyway.
On 4 October 2003, the song was selected as the next single for Canadian radio stations (Hot A/C and CHR formats). On 10 October 2003, it was announced that a remix of the track was available on "TeamCeline", this remix version by the "Original 3" was released as a single.

Critical reception 
Elisabeth Vincetelli of Entertainment Weekly wrote a very positive review, stating that "One Hearts best qualities are encapsulated on Faith, a Martin track that matches a hooky chorus with pneumatic arrangements that cushion the star without overwhelming her. Ultimately, this record is about the singing, not the production or the writing." The Barnes & Noble Editorial review was also positive, calling it "infectious" and that the song "benefit from Dion's beautifully subtle vocal interpretation, reminding us that for all the gloss, she's a talent to be reckoned with."

Track listing and formatsCanadian promotional CD single''' 
"Faith" (Original 3 Remix) – 3:42
"Faith" (Album Version) – 3:42

Charts

Credits and personnel
Recording locations
Recording -  Echo Beach Studios (Florida, United States)

Personnel
Songwriting – Max Martin, Rami
Production – Max Martin, Rami
Recording – Max Martin, Rami
Mixing - Max Martin, Rami
Backing Vocals – Anna Nordell, Max Martin
Guitars - Esbjörn Öhrwall
Bass – Thomas Lindberg

Credits adapted from the liner notes of One Heart'', Epic Records.

References

External links

Celine Dion songs
2003 singles
Songs written by Max Martin
Songs written by Rami Yacoub
Song recordings produced by Rami Yacoub
Song recordings produced by Max Martin
2003 songs
Columbia Records singles
Epic Records singles